Anne Cheryl Petersen (born September 11, 1944) is an American developmental scientist. Among her many administrative roles, she served as deputy director and chief operating officer of the National Science Foundation, and vice-president of programs at the W. K. Kellogg Foundation. She is one of the founders of the Association for Psychological Science. In 2000, she was listed as one of the most influential psychologists by the Encyclopedia of Psychology. Her research focused primarily on adolescent development and gender issues.

Early life and education 
Petersen was born in Little Falls, Minnesota on September 11, 1944, to Rhoda Pauline Sandwick Studley and Franklin Hanks Studley. Her mother, Rhoda, was a secretary, and her father, Franklin, was a coach and a teacher.

Petersen studied as an undergraduate at the University of Chicago, receiving a Bachelor of Arts in mathematics in 1966. She continued her education at the University of Chicago, receiving a Master of Science in statistics in 1972, and a Doctor of Philosophy in Measurement, Evaluation, and Statistical Analysis in 1973.

Career and research 
Petersen has published over 350 articles and 18 books concerning areas of psychology, especially adolescent health and development, gender issues, science policy, and global issues.  Her research also focused on adolescent pubertal development, including the development and publication of the widely used Pubertal Development Scale (PDS) for young adolescents. Petersen worked as a professor at Pennsylvania State University from August 1982 to March 1992. On July 1, 1987, she became the first dean of the College of Health and Human Development at Pennsylvania State University. In 1991, Petersen was named first vice-president for Research and also Dean of the Graduate School at the University of Minnesota, Twin Cities. She was also Full Professor at the Institute of Child Development at the University of Minnesota, Twin Cities, where she worked from May 1992 to March 1995, followed by her role as Senior Vice President in charge of programming at the W. K. Kellogg Foundation from 1996 to 2005.

Petersen continued her professional career at Stanford University. From August 2006 to June 2009, Petersen was a deputy director and professor at the Center for Advanced Study in the Behavioral Sciences at Stanford. In 2010, she accepted a position as a research professor at the University of Michigan. From January 2010 to the present, Petersen has been at the Center for Human Growth and Development at the University of Michigan. She is also a faculty affiliate of the Science, Technology, and Public Policy (STPP) program at the Gerald R. Ford School of Public Policy.

Philanthropy 
Petersen was the Senior Vice President Programs and Corporate Officer of the W. K. Kellogg Foundation for 10 years. The Kellogg Foundation funds programs that benefit children from disadvantaged communities in primarily low income areas. As Senior Vice President, Petersen was responsible for all United States, Latin American, and southern African programs in the organization.

Following her work with the Kellogg Foundation, Petersen founded the non-profit, public foundation Global Philanthropy Alliance (GPA), which funds "early stage youth-led entrepreneur organizations in Africa." The Alliance makes small grants to organizations in African countries. An African board and country committees help to source grants for the GPA. In addition to being one of the founders of the Global Philanthropy Alliance, Petersen is also the president.

Selected works 
 Witting, M. A., & Petersen, A. C. (1979). Sex-Related Differences in Cognitive Functioning: Developmental Issues. New York: Academic Press.
 Brooks-Gunn, J., & Petersen, A. C. (1983). Girls at Puberty: Biological and Psychosocial Perspectives. New York: Plenum Press.
 Lerner, R. M., Petersen, A. C., & Brooks-Gunn, J. (1991). Encyclopedia of Adolescence. New York: Garland.
 Petersen, A. C., & Mortimer, J. T. (2006). Youth Unemployment and Society. Cambridge: Cambridge University Press.
 Millstein, S. G., Petersen, A. C., & Nightingale, E. O. (2007). Promoting the Health of Adolescents: New Directions for the Twenty-first Century. New York: Oxford University Press.
 Gibson, K. R., & Petersen, A. C. (2011). Brain Maturation and Cognitive Development: Comparative and Cross-cultural Perspectives. New Brunswick: Transaction.
 Petersen, A. C., Joseph, J., & Feit, M. N. (2014). New Directions in Child Abuse and Neglect Research. Washington, D.C.: National Academies Press.
 Graber, J. A., Brooks-Gunn, J., & Petersen, A. C. (2016). Transitions through Adolescence: Interpersonal Domains and Context. London: Routledge.

Honors 
 Election to the National Academy of Medicine/NASEM
 Chair of NASEM's Policy and Global Affairs Divisional Committee
 Fellow of the American Association for the Advancement of Science (AAAS)
 Fellow of the International Society for the Study of Behavioural Development (ISSBD)
 Fellow of the American Psychological Association (APA)
 Founding fellow of the Association for Psychological Science (APS)
 Co-founder of the Society for Research on Adolescence
 Deputy Director and Chief Operating Officer of the National Science Foundation (NSF)

References 

Living people
1944 births
21st-century American psychologists
American neuroscientists
University of Chicago alumni
American women psychologists
American women neuroscientists
University of Michigan faculty
21st-century American women
Members of the National Academy of Medicine
20th-century American psychologists